Fritz Wagnerberger (14 June 1937 – 23 March 2010) was a German alpine skier. He competed at the 1960 Winter Olympics and the 1964 Winter Olympics.

References

External links
 

1937 births
2010 deaths
German male alpine skiers
Olympic alpine skiers of the United Team of Germany
Alpine skiers at the 1960 Winter Olympics
Alpine skiers at the 1964 Winter Olympics
People from Traunstein
Sportspeople from Upper Bavaria
Universiade gold medalists for West Germany
Universiade medalists in alpine skiing
Competitors at the 1964 Winter Universiade
20th-century German people